Sandpines Golf Links is a public golf course in Florence, Oregon, United States, on the central Oregon Coast.

Course
The course was designed by Rees Jones and is bordered on the ocean side by the Oregon Dunes National Recreation Area. 

Bent Grass is predominantly used.

It is a regulation 18-hole, par-72 course, measuring around 7200 yards.  The slope rating is around 130 (making it reasonably difficult for bogey golfers). 

The first nine holes have a coastal forest character. The second nine holes have a more traditional links character.

Ranking

1998: The course was rated 72nd in Golf Magazine's category of "Top 100 Courses You Can Play in the U.S.".

External links
Sandpines Golf Links (official website)

Golf clubs and courses in Oregon
Buildings and structures in Lane County, Oregon
Oregon Coast
Golf clubs and courses designed by Rees Jones